Kelsey Lalor (born March 1, 1998 in Red Deer, Alberta) is a Canadian baseball player. She is a member of the Canada women's national baseball team which won a silver medal at the 2015 Pan American Games.

Playing career

Baseball
Lalor made her debut for the national team at the 2013 Canada-Japan series in Granby, QC. Competing at the 2014 IBAF Women’s World Cup, Lalor scored five runs while registering four RBI’s in six games played.
Competing with Team Alberta, she helped the squad capture the gold medal at the 2014 Senior Women’s Invitational (also known as the Canadian women’s baseball championships). 

She joined the Boise State Broncos in 2020, where she plays softball shortstop.

Honors and Awards 

 2016 & 2018:Women’s Open Player of the Year by Baseball Alberta 
 2018: All-World Team as an outfielder in 2018 
 Academic All-Mountain West (2020)
 Mountain West Scholar-Athlete (2020)

References

1998 births
Baseball people from Alberta
Baseball players at the 2015 Pan American Games
Canadian female baseball players
Living people
Pan American Games medalists in baseball
Pan American Games silver medalists for Canada
Sportspeople from Red Deer, Alberta
Medalists at the 2015 Pan American Games